Xenophysogobio boulengeri is a species of cyprinid fish endemic to China.

Named in honor of George A. Boulenger (1858-1937), who provided “some guidance” (translation) in the completion of Tchang’s paper.

References

Xenophysogobio
Taxa named by Tchang Tchung-Lin
Fish described in 1929